Astrup is a village in Mariagerfjord Municipality, Denmark.

Notable people 
 Jørn Lund (born 1944 in Astrup) a former Danish cyclist, team bronze medallist in the 1976 Summer Olympics

References

Villages in Denmark
Populated places in the North Jutland Region
Mariagerfjord Municipality